The Strikes (Minimum Service Levels) Bill 2023 is a proposed Act of Parliament affecting UK labour law designed to force trade union workers in England, Scotland and Wales to provide a minimum service during a strike in health, education services, fire and rescue, border security and nuclear decommissioning. The proposal has been criticised as being not in the 2019 Conservative Party Manifesto, being a violation of human rights, and being a violation of international law.

Background
The legislation was published on 10 January 2023 by the Department for Business, Energy and Industrial Strategy and introduced into Parliament by the Conservative Secretary of State for Business, Grant Shapps. It follows a prolonged period of industrial action in the United Kingdom during 2022 and 2023, and is the second piece of legislation seeking to secure a minimum service after legislation covering the transport sector was introduced in October 2022. Launching the bill, Shapps said that the hope was to reach an agreement on the minimum level of service "that mean that we don't have to use that power in the bill". The proposals drew criticism from Paul Nowak, the General Secretary of the Trades Union Congress, who said that it would "prolong disputes and poison industrial relations – leading to more frequent strikes", while unions threatened to take legal action against the government if the legislation is signed into law. The Labour Party said that it would repeal the legislation if it were to be passed.

Contents
The 2023 bill seeks to expand the guarantee of a minimum service to the National Health Service, education, fire and rescue, border security, and nuclear decommissioning. It would allow employers to issue a "work notice" stating who should work in the event of a strike, with no automatic protection against unfair dismissal for those who refuse. The legislation will allow the Business Secretary "to make regulations providing for levels of service where there are strikes in relevant services".

Minimum service levels are not defined in the Bill, but are left to the discretion of the Minister.

If unions do not provide minimum service levels during a strike, then the union lose immunity from being sued in tort for damages to the employer for economic loss, and workers lose protection from unfair dismissal.

Passage through parliament
On 16 January 2023, MPs voted 309–249 in favour of the bill following its first reading. It then moved to the committee stage.

On 30 January, MPs voted 315–246 in favour of the bill, which was then sent to the House of Lords for further debate.

See also
UK labour law

References

2023 in British law
2023 in British politics
United Kingdom labour law
Department for Business, Energy and Industrial Strategy
January 2023 events in the United Kingdom